Bogdan Tudor (born November 29, 1976) is a former Romanian rugby union player. He played as a lock.

Club career
During his career, Tudor played for Valence in France.

International career
Tudor gathered 2 caps for Romania, both of them in 2003. He was a member of his national side for the 6th  Rugby World Cup in 2003, where he played one match and his final one for the Oaks in Pool A against the host country, the Wallabies.

References

External links

1976 births
Living people
Romanian rugby union players
Romania international rugby union players
Rugby union locks
Expatriate rugby union players in France